The Padang Jawa Komuter station is a commuter train halt located in Padang Jawa, Selangor, Malaysia. It is served by the Port Klang Line. Padang Jawa is a village between the towns Shah Alam and Klang. Universiti Teknologi MARA main campus is located around 2 kilometers from the halt.

Former branch line
A 47 km branch line to Kuala Selangor once began from this station, until it was closed in the 1930s.

Around the station
 Universiti Teknologi MARA (2 km)
 I-City (3 km)

See also
 Rail transport in Malaysia

References

Railway stations in Selangor
Rapid transit stations in Selangor
Port Klang Line